Herbaspirillum aquaticum is a bacterium of the genus Herbaspirillum.

References

External links
Type strain of Herbaspirillum aquaticum at BacDive -  the Bacterial Diversity Metadatabase

Burkholderiales
Bacteria described in 2011